Javier  Nicolás Burrai (born 9 October 1990) is an Argentine footballer who plays as a goalkeeper for Barcelona SC in the Liga PRO Ecuador.

Honours 
Serie A (1): 2020

External links

Argentine footballers
1990 births
Living people
Argentine people of Italian descent
Ecuadorian Serie A players
Guillermo Brown footballers
Club Atlético Sarmiento footballers
Barcelona S.C. footballers
Gimnasia y Esgrima de Jujuy footballers
C.S.D. Macará footballers
Argentine expatriate footballers
Expatriate footballers in Ecuador
Association football goalkeepers
Footballers from Buenos Aires